Kaneh Rashid may refer to:
 Kaneh Rashid-e Allah Feqid
 Kaneh Rashid-e Arab
 Kaneh Rashid-e Babakhan
 Kaneh Rashid-e Gol Morad